Dos Mundos is the debut album of country music artist Rick Trevino, released in 1993 on Columbia Records. Its title is Spanish for "Two Worlds". The album produced no chart singles, although "Bastante Cordón" would be re-recorded in English as "Just Enough Rope" and serve as the first single to Trevino's self-titled second album. Also included is a Spanish-language cover of Bill Anderson's "Walk Out Backwards", which Trevino later covered in English on his 1994 self-titled album.

Track listing
"Salte de Espalda" (Bill Anderson) – 2:40A
Spanish-language version of "Walk Out Backwards"
"No Perdí la Razón" (Flores Peregrino, Kim Williams, Lonnie Wilson) – 2:49
"Tal Como Ayer" (Larry Boone, Peregrino) – 3:26
"Bastante Cordón" (Karen Staley, Steve Dean) – 4:17B
Spanish-language version of "Just Enough Rope"
"Un Momento Allá" (Mike McGuire, Billy Maddox, Billy Henderson) – 3:11B
"Change for a Quarter Moon" (Jeff Crossan) – 3:06
"Podría Volar" (Victor Guerra, Jeffrey M. Tweel) – 3:19
"Si Quieres Conmigo" (Boone, Guerra, William Robinson) – 3:25
"A Quarter at a Time" (Boone, Paul Nelson) – 2:39
"Si Tú Ves a un Hombre Llorar" (Guerra, Peregrino, Rick Trevino) – 3:25

ASpanish-language translation by Flores Peregrino
BSpanish-language translation by Flores Peregrino and Victor Guerra

Personnel
 Eddie Bayers - drums
 Mark Casstevens - acoustic guitar
 Paul Franklin - steel guitar
 Sonny Garrish - steel guitar
 Steve Gibson - acoustic guitar, mandolin
 Rob Hajacos - fiddle
 David Hungate - bass guitar
 John Barlow Jarvis - piano
 Randy McCormick - piano
 Brent Mason - electric guitar
 Tom Robb - bass guitar
 Rick Trevino - lead vocals, background vocals

References
[ Dos Mundos] at Allmusic

1993 debut albums
Columbia Records albums
Rick Trevino albums
Albums produced by Steve Buckingham (record producer)
Spanish-language albums